Timothy Hoven (born December 22, 1963) is a Wisconsin politician and businessman.

Born in Milwaukee, Wisconsin, Hoven graduated from University of Wisconsin–Oshkosh with a degree in criminal justice. Beginning in 1995, Hoven served in the Wisconsin State Assembly. On August 1, 2002, Hoven resigned from the Wisconsin State Assembly to return to the private sector.

References

Politicians from Milwaukee
University of Wisconsin–Oshkosh alumni
Members of the Wisconsin State Assembly
1963 births
Living people